Kenton Hundred is a hundred in Kent County, Delaware, United States. Kenton Hundred was formed in 1869 from Duck Creek Hundred. Its primary community is Kenton.

References

Hundreds in Kent County, Delaware
Kenton, Delaware